The sport of football in the country of Tonga is run by the Tonga Football Association. The association administers the national football team, as well as the Tonga Major League.

The Tonga national football team has had limited success internationally.

References